Alfred McMichael was an Australian rules footballer. He was the first captain of the South Australian state football team.

Personal life 
His younger brother Samuel McMichael played for Fitzroy.

References 

1855 births
Australian rules footballers from Victoria (Australia)
Norwood Football Club players
Year of death missing